Tepe Maranjan was a Buddhist monastery, located on the eastern outskirts of Kabul, and dated to the 4th century CE, or the 6-7th century for the Buddhist phase. Many Buddhist sculptures were discovered on the site. They are made of clay, and stylistically derived from the sculptures of Hadda, but preceded the style of the Fondukistan monastery. Tepe Maranjan can be considered as representative of the Art of Gandhara of the 5th or 6th century CE.

The archaeological site of Tepe Maranjan was excavated by French DAFA Jean Carl in 1933, again by Gérard Fussman in 1976 archaeologist In a suburb of Kabul, east of the tomb of King Nadir Shah and south of the road to Jalalabad and Peshawar, the monastery of Tepe Maranjan was excavated by Jean Carl in 1933. The site was surveyed again by gérard fussman in 1976 and by Zemaralaï Tarzi of the Afghan Institute of Archaeology more recently.

A large hoard of Sasanian Empire coins was discovered in Tepe Maranjan: 367 Sasanian silver drachms from king Shapur II (309-79) to Ardashir II (379-83), which, owing to their uniformity, are thought to have been minted in the vicinity of Kabul. The hoard also contained 12 scyphate gold dinars of the Kidarites, which might have circulated at the same time as the Sasanian coins, or may have been added later.

Gallery

See also
 Destruction of art in Afghanistan
 Kabul hoard

References

Buddhist monasteries in Asia